Captain Keishing Clifford Nongrum, MVC (7 March 1975 – 1 July 1999) was an Indian Army officer of 12 Jammu and Kashmir Light Infantry. He was posthumously awarded the Maha Vir Chakra, India's second-highest gallantry award, for exemplary valor in combat during operations in the Kargil War in 1999.

Early years and education
Nongrum was born and brought up in Shillong, Meghalaya, India, in a Christian family. His father, Keishing Peter, worked at State Bank of India while his mother, Saily Nongrum, is a housewife.

Nongrum received his high-school education from Don Bosco Technical School, Shillong and attended St. Anthony's College, Shillong. He was a bright student who consistently performed well in academics and sports.

Captain Nongrum believed Indian military service has an important role to integrate North-Eastern states with mainstream India. Before Kargil war, Nongrum visited the principal of his alma mater, St Anthony's College, Shillong to discuss the matter and wanted to speak to the students about the Indian army.

Military life 
He graduated from the Officers Training Academy, Chennai and was commissioned into the 12th battalion of the Jammu and Kashmir Light Infantry.

Kargil War and death
At the outbreak of war, his battalion was posted to the Batalik sector.
The mission was assigned to 12 JAK LI on 30 June 1999 to capture the strategically important Point 4812 in the Batalik sector. Capt Nongrum was tasked to lead the assault team for this critical mission.

Capt Nongrum was awarded the Mahavir Chakra for his gallant action in this operation.
 
The Maha Vir Chakra citation reads as follows:

Legacy
Captain Keishing Clifford Nongrum is the only person from the state of Meghalaya to have won this distinct and prestigious honour. 

A bust of Captain Keishing Clifford Nongrum has been recently inaugurated at Rhino Museum Shillong in his memory.

The Meghalaya government renamed Rilbong Chowk to Clifford Nongrum Square in honor of Captain Keishing Clifford Nongrum.

References

1975 births
1999 deaths
People from Shillong
Deaths by firearm in India
Indian Army officers
Recipients of the Maha Vir Chakra
Indian military personnel killed in action
People associated with Shillong
Naga people
Khasi people